Flushing–Main Street is a station on the Long Island Rail Road's Port Washington Branch in the Flushing neighborhood of Queens, New York City. The station is located at Main Street and 41st Avenue, off Kissena Boulevard.

History

The Flushing–Main Street station was originally built in December 1853 as the Flushing station by the New York and Flushing Railroad, but not opened until June 26, 1854. Flushing served as the terminus of the NY&F until October 30, 1864 when a subsidiary known as the North Shore Railroad extended it to Great Neck, and it was burned in order to prepare for a second station that was built between January and February 1865. In 1868, the station and the rest of the line were acquired by the Flushing and North Side Railroad, which razed the second station in 1870 and built a third station between October and November 1870. The station was renamed after both Flushing and Main Street, in order to distinguish itself from the former Flushing Bridge Street station that ran along the F&NS's Whitestone Branch, which was abandoned by the LIRR in 1932.

During the mid-1870s, the station and the rest of the line merged with the Central Railroad of Long Island to form the Flushing, North Shore and Central Railroad, and then became part of the Port Washington Branch of the Long Island Rail Road, which also used the station as the eastern terminus of the White Line between 1873 and 1876. Shortly after the line was electrified on October 22, 1912, the station was abandoned on November 11, 1912, as part of an effort by the Long Island Rail Road to bring the Port Washington Branch above and below street level depending on the location.

In Flushing, the station was elevated along with the rest of the tracks on October 4, 1913. Until that point, the line used to run at grade and went through a tunnel under a girls' school just east of where the Main Street overpass stands today. The tunnel and the school were torn down to build the overpass and the open cut through which the line now runs. In 1958, the elevated track level building was razed and replaced with a street level ticket office. Sheltered platforms exist on both sides of the tracks in the former station's place, and the sidewalks beneath the bridge serve local businesses.

Accessibility
The Metropolitan Transportation Authority renovated the station in the 2010s, bringing it into compliance with the 1990 Americans With Disabilities Act. According to a description of the $24.6 million project, one elevator was built from each platform to street level, and various components of the station were renovated. A one-story commercial building on the west side of Main Street was demolished and replaced by a station house with an elevator, which provided more direct access to the westbound platform.

On October 28, 2013, the MTA held a public hearing on the proposed acquisition of private property at 40-36 Main Street in Flushing for the purpose of adding an elevator intended for the rebuilt station. By June 2015, design had been completed and one of the two parcels of private property, a food stall, had been acquired. The MTA expected to complete the eminent domain acquisition of Ou-Jang Supermarket's 40-36 Main Street property by summer 2015; the supermarket objected to the amount MTA offered, $974,592. On January 6, 2016, filings in Queens County Superior Court showed that MTA and the supermarket reached a settlement of $2,236,600, of which $1.9 million was the cash purchase price and the remainder represented rent to be paid by MTA on behalf of the supermarket at its new location. The MTA began in July 2016 and planned to complete the project by the 4th quarter of 2017. In December 2015, the MTA had put the project out for competitive bidding with a proposal due date of December 9, 2015.

On July 22, 2016, the ticket office was closed as part of the two-year renovation project along with the staircase to the eastbound platform with a temporary staircase and platform extension providing access. The current staircase to the city-bound platform was closed for renovation upon the opening of a new staircase and elevator. Completion of the project was set for early 2018; as of summer 2018, the elevators had been completed. The rebuilt station was designed by Urbahn Architects.

Station layout
The station has two high-level side platforms, each 10 cars long.

Bus service
In addition to connecting with the nearby subway station of the same name, Flushing–Main Street serves as a major bus-to-rail interchange in Queens, with over 20 bus routes running through or terminating in the area .

Gallery

References

External links

Unofficial LIRR Website Photos.
Views of  Main Street Ticket Booth,
Embankment on south side of the tracks,
Views of Platform B (To Port Washington),
Shelter for and Staircase to Port Washington-bound Platform
Staircase to Platform A (To Manhattan)
 Main Street entrance from Google Maps Street View
 Platforms from Google Maps Street View (2016)
 East end of platforms from Google Maps Street View (2018)
 Middle of platforms from Google Maps Street View (2018)
 West end of platforms from Google Maps Street View (2018) 
 Alleyway Entrance from Google Maps Street View (2018) 

Railway stations in Queens, New York
Long Island Rail Road stations in New York City
Railway stations in the United States opened in 1854
Flushing, Queens